Rothienorman is a village in Aberdeenshire in north east Scotland.

The local economy is based primarily on farming, whilst services are provided by a mobile Post Office van, village shop, the Rothie Inn hotel and barber, which has just recently closed down.  A recent addition to the community was the high-performance automobile vendor Indy Car Sales, which has since closed.  The garage was then bought by K G Autotech.  It is now trading under TG (The Garage) Rothienorman, carrying out repairs and MOT testing.

Rothienorman House

Rothienorman Castle became Rothienorman House and then Rothie House. It was subjected to major rebuilding c.1800 and was baronialised 1862 (architect James Matthews).  c.1912 it was owned by Reginald Crawford-Leslie whose family home it was until just after WW2. It belonged to the Crawford family and Henry Nigel Crawford was the last laird of Rothienorman succeeding his brother Jock who was killed in action. The family name used to be Leslie, became Crawford-Leslie and was then shortened to Crawford. The Leslie family purchased Rothienorman in 1723. The Crawfords had to sell Rothie in 1951 because of death duties incurred during the war. The estate was broken up and the house was stripped by land agents for quick money. The surviving Crawfords now live in New Zealand. The house was still occupied in 1945 but the roof was removed; the house is now overgrown with ivy and is in a bad state of repair.

Railway
Rothienorman was on the Inveramsey - MacDuff Branch Railway which opened in 1857 and closed to passengers in 1951.

Twenty-first century developments
Recent changes (2009) see Indy Car Sales closing down, the Post Office under threat of closure and the new primary school close to capacity.  The Bowling Club has been rebuilt and a new community centre as well.  There is a local dog park at the north end of the village and a new community garden at the south entrance.

In recent years there has also been a restaurant called The Steadin that has opened. This addition to Rothienorman came almost at the same time as the building of the Scotia Homes which has been dubbed by the villagers as "The new houses."

The primary school in Rothienorman features an astro turf football pitch which is frequently used by the youth of Rothienorman and surrounding areas. Rothie Rovers play at Forgue Road in the village and joined the North Region Junior Football Association in 2020.

In 2021 The Steadin got turned into a Chinese takeaway

References

Villages in Aberdeenshire